Latvia–Lithuania relations are bilateral international relations between Latvia and Lithuania. Latvia has an embassy in Vilnius, and Lithuania has an embassy in Riga. 

Both states share a long common history: both Latvians and Lithuanians belong to the family of Baltic peoples, speakers of the Baltic languages. The territory of Latvia and Lithuania were together part of the Grand Duchy of Lithuania and the Polish–Lithuanian Commonwealth between 1561 and 1772 (with a brief period of Swedish rule in what is now Latvia in between). Between the late 18th century and 1918, the territory of both Lithuania and Latvia was part of the Russian Empire. Lithuania and Latvia re-established their diplomatic relations on October 5, 1991, after independence from the Soviet Union.

The two states share  of common border. Both countries are full members of the European Union and NATO.

1920s border dispute
In the early 1920s, Latvia and Lithuania had a peaceful dispute about the towns of Palanga and Šventoji which were initially part of Latvia following the country's independence but were of strategic interest to Lithuania. The dispute was peacefully resolved in 1921 with the help of an international commission, and the territories were transferred to Lithuania. As a compensation, Latvia received the Latvian-majority territories of what now are Ukri Parish, Brunava Parish, Aknīste Parish. Latvia's claims on the town of Mažeikiai were rejected by the international commission. The Lithuanians had to drop their claims on Ilūkste Municipality and Daugavpils.

Resident diplomatic missions

 Latvia has an embassy in Vilnius.
 Lithuania has an embassy in Riga.

See also
Foreign relations of Latvia
Foreign relations of Lithuania
2004 enlargement of the European Union
Lithuanians in Latvia
Latvians in Lithuania

References

External links
  Embassy of the Republic of Latvia in the Republic of Lithuania
   Embassy of the Republic of Lithuania in the Republic of Latvia

 
Lithuania
Bilateral relations of Lithuania